The Château de la Fauconnière was a country house in Menomblet, Vendée, Pays de la Loire, France, which burnt down in March 2013.

References

Châteaux in Vendée
Buildings and structures demolished in 2013